Stinkstein (German for "stinking stone") has historically referred to:

 Antozonite, a radioactive fluorite variety
 dolomite, a carbonate mineral